John Fraser (March 3, 1849 – February 1, 1928) was a Canadian politician.

Born in Glen Urquhart, Inverness-shire, Scotland, Fraser came to Canada in 1852. He was mayor of Petrolia, Ontario from 1885 to 1889. He was elected to the House of Commons of Canada for the electoral district of Lambton East in the 1896 federal election. A Liberal, he was defeated in 1900. In 1902, he was appointed Postmaster of Petrolia.

References
 
 Short sketches with photographs of the wardens, parliamentary representatives, judicial officers and county officials of the county of Lambton... : from 1852 to 1917.

1849 births
1928 deaths
Liberal Party of Canada MPs
Mayors of places in Ontario
Members of the House of Commons of Canada from Ontario